Samuel Friedrich Siegfried (7 October 1809, in Zofingen – 31 October 1882) was a Swiss politician and President of the Swiss National Council (1856).

External links 
 
 

1809 births
1882 deaths
People from Zofingen
Swiss Calvinist and Reformed Christians
Members of the Council of States (Switzerland)
Members of the National Council (Switzerland)
Presidents of the National Council (Switzerland)